R. rosea may refer to:

 Rhodinocichla rosea, the rosy thrush-tanager, a bird species
 Rhodiola rosea, the golden root, roseroot or Aaron's Rod, a plant species found in cold regions of the world
 Rhodostethia rosea, the Ross's gull, a bird species
 Romulea rosea, a herbaceous perennial plant species endemic to the western Cape Province in South Africa
 Roseomonas rosea, a species of Gram-negative bacteria

See also
 Rosea (disambiguation)